This is a timeline documenting events of Jazz in the year 1998.

Events

January
 29 – The very first Polarjazz started in Longyearbyen, Svalbard (February 29 – 31).

April
 3 – The 25th Vossajazz started in Voss, Norway (April 3 – 5).

May
 20 – The 26th Nattjazz started in Bergen, Norway (May 20 – 31).

June
 2 – The 27th Moers Festival started in Moers, Germany (June 2 – 5).

July
 1 – The 19th Montreal International Jazz Festival started in Montreal, Quebec, Canada (July 1 – 12).
 2 – The 8th Jazz Fest Wien started in Wien, Austria (July 2 – 10).
 3 – The 32nd Montreux Jazz Festival started in Montreux, Switzerland (July 3 – 18).
 10
 The 23rd North Sea Jazz Festival started in The Hague, Netherlands (July 10 – 12).
 The 33rd Pori Jazz started in Pori, Finland (July 10 – 19).

August
 7 – The 15th Brecon Jazz Festival started in Brecon, Wales (August 7 – 9).

September
 18 – The 41st Monterey Jazz Festival started in Monterey, California (September 18 – 20).

Album releases
Dave Douglas: Convergence
Paul Plimley: Sensology
Vandermark 5: Target Dr Flag
Zeena Parkins: Pan-Acousticon
Evan Parker: Drawn Inward
Dave Holland: Points of View
Roy Campbell: Ancestral Homeland
Hugh Masekela: Black to the Future

Deaths 

 January
 1 – Dave Schildkraut, American alto saxophonist (born 1925).
 8 – Jimmy Butts, American upright bassist (born 1917).
 16 – Tommy Pederson, American trombonist and composer (born 1920).
 22 – Anselmo Sacasas, Cuban pianist, bandleader, composer, and arranger (born 1912).
 24 – Walter Bishop Jr., American pianist (born 1927).
 25 – Attila Zoller, American guitarist (born 1927).
 26 – Orlando DiGirolamo, American accordionist, pianist, and composer (born 1924).

 February
 5 – Nick Webb, English guitarist and composer, Acoustic Alchemy (born 1954).
 13 – Thomas Chapin, American composer, saxophonist, and multi-instrumentalist (born 1957).

 March
 2 – Marzette Watts, American tenor and soprano saxophonist (born 1938).
 12 – Red Richards, American pianist (born 1912).
 15 – Tim Maia, Brazilian musician, songwriter and businessman (born 1942).
 22 – George Howard, American saxophonist (born 1956).
 24 – Denis Charles, American drummer (born 1933).
 27 – Jimmy Campbell, American drummer (born 1928).

 April
 3 – Alvin Tyler, American saxophonist and arranger (born 1925).
 9 – Tom Cora, American cellist and composer (born 1953).
 21 – Helen Ward, American singer (born 1913).
 24 – Mel Powell, American pianist, composer and educator (born 1923).

 May
 5 – Syd Lawrence, British trumpeter and bandleader (born 1923).
 7 – Blue Lu Barker, American singer (born 1913).
 8 – Raymond Premru, American trombonist and composer (born 1934).
 14 – Frank Sinatra, American singer and actor (born 1915).
 19 – Dorothy Donegan, American pianist (born 1922).
 22 – Milton Banana, American drummer (born 1935).
 24 – George Kelly, American tenor saxophonist, vocalist and arranger (born 1915).
 27 – Spencer Clark, American bass saxophonist and multi-instrumentalist (born 1908).
 28 – Joe Dixon, American reedist (born 1917).
 29 – Ted Dunbar, American guitarist, composer and educator  (born 1937).

 June
 8 – Harry Lookofsky, American violinist (born 1913).
 10
 Bobby Bryant, American trumpeter and flugelhorn player (born 1934).
 Jimmy Henderson, American trombonist and bandleader (born 1921).
 20 – Robert Normann, Norwegian guitarist (born 1916).
 22 – Benny Green, British saxophonist (born 1927).

 July
 2 – Errol Parker, French-Algerian pianist ( (born 1925).
 11 – Guy Lafitte, American tenor saxophonist (born 1927).
 14 – Beryl Bryden, English singer (born 1920).
 25 – Tal Farlow, American guitarist (born 1921).
 28 – Dorothy Sloop, American pianist (born 1913).

 August
 6 – Nat Gonella, American trumpeter, bandleader and vocalist (born 1908).
 11 – Benny Waters, American saxophonist and clarinetist (born 1902).
 16 – Milton Adolphus, American pianist and composer (born 1913).
 22 – Jimmy Skidmore, English tenor saxophonist (born 1916).
 24 – Carl Barriteau, Trinidadian clarinetist (born 1914).

 September
 6 – Bob Hames, American guitarist (born 1920).
 15 – Barrett Deems, American drummer (born 1914).
 16 – Andrzej Trzaskowski, Polish composer, pianist, and musicologist (born 1933).
 26 – Betty Carter, American singer, composer, and bandleader (born 1929).

 October
 8 – Glenn Spearman, American tenor saxophonist (born 1947).
 31 – Sherwood Johnson, American jazz patron and the founder in 1954 of Shakey's Pizza (born 1925).

 November
 12 – Kenny Kirkland, American pianist and keyboardist (born 1955).
 20 – Roland Alphonso, Jamaican tenor saxophonist, The Skatalites (born 1931).
 29 – George Van Eps, American guitarist (born 1913).

 December
 2 – Bob Haggart, American upright bassist, composer and arranger (born 1914).
 4 – Egil Johansen, Norwegian-Swedish drummer (born 1934).
 26 – Dick Grove, American pianist and composer (born 1927).

 Unknown date
 David Earle Johnson, American percussionist, a composer and a music producer (born unknown date).

Births 
 Unknown date
 Sasha Berliner, American vibraphonist, percussionist, composer, producer, and band leader.

See also

1990s in jazz
 List of years in jazz
1998 in music

References

External links 
 History Of Jazz Timeline: 1998 at All About Jazz

Jazz
Jazz by year